Maiden Vows (Polish original title: Śluby Panieńskie and USA title: War of Love) is a 2010 Polish historical drama directed by Filip Bajon. The film is an adaptation of Aleksander Fredro's play of the same title from 1832. The film was shot in Kotuń and in the open-air museum in Nowa Sucha near Węgrów from August 26 to September 30, 2010.

The film is set in the nineteenth century, but the film has anachronistic contemporary inserts (e.g. car, cell phones, modern press).

Plot 
1825, a small manor house in the south of Poland. Majętny Radost (Robert Więckiewicz) intends to get his nephew Gustaw (Maciej Stuhr) with the beautiful Aniela (Anna Cieślak) - the daughter of Dobrójska (Edyta Olszówka) living next door. The parties quickly agree on the marriage contract. The problem is that Gucio spends the nights at the "Under the Golden Parrot" tavern, seduces women, drinks, dances and never marries.

Also, Aniela, who is influenced by her cousin Klara (Marta Żmuda Trzebiatowska), is far from thinking about marriage. Klara, an ardent opponent of men, is constantly mocking the intrusive romantic Albin (Borys Szyc) who is in love with her. This temperamental, intelligent, brilliant woman, defiant and blunt, wants to decide her own fate. Therefore, he plays with Albin's love and rebels openly against common morals. Realizing that the family also wants to see her and Albina on the wedding carpet, he convinces Angela to make maiden vows. Aniela and Klara swear an oath: I promise unwavering stability for women, hate the masculine race, never be a wife.

However, girls' weddings cannot be kept secret. When Gustav finds out about them, the spirit of perversity awakens in him. He decides to get everyone involved in a clever intrigue. He wants to make Aniela confess to him and Klara appreciate Albin's affection.

Cast 

 Robert Więckiewicz as Radost
 Maciej Stuhr as Gustaw
 Anna Cieślak as Aniela
 Edyta Olszówka as Dobrójska
 Marta Żmuda Trzebiatowska as Klara
 Borys Szyc as Albin
 Andrzej Grabowski as Klara's father
 Daniel Olbrychski as nobleman
 Marian Opania as nobleman
 Lech Ordon as nobleman
 Marian Dziędziel as nobleman
 Jerzy Braszka as nobleman
 Michał Piela as Albina's farmhand
 Wiktor Zborowski as Jan
 Stefan Szmidt as Radost's valet
 Henryk Rajfer as Cadyk
 Jerzy Rogalski as Albina's servant
 Dariusz Kuchta as Huzar
 Jan Nowicki

References

External links
 

2010 films
Polish historical drama films
Films set in the 1820s
2010s historical drama films